These are the official results of the Men's discus throw event at the 1986 European Championships in Stuttgart, West Germany, held at Neckarstadion on 30 and 31 August 1986.

Medalists

Results

Final
31 August

Qualification
30 August

Participation
According to an unofficial count, 21 athletes from 12 countries participated in the event.

 (1)
 (2)
 (1)
 (1)
 (1)
 (1)
 (3)
 (1)
 (3)
 (2)
 (2)
 (3)

See also
 1983 Men's World Championships Discus Throw (Helsinki)
 1987 Men's World Championships Discus Throw (Rome)
 1988 Men's Olympic Discus Throw (Seoul)

References

 Results

Discus throw
Discus throw at the European Athletics Championships